Thunderball is the soundtrack album for the fourth James Bond film Thunderball.

The album was first released by United Artists Records in 1965 in both monaural and stereo editions, with a CD release in 1988. The music was composed and conducted by John Barry, and performed by the John Barry Orchestra. This was Barry's third soundtrack for the series. The soundtrack was still being recorded when it came time for the album to be released, so the LP only featured twelve tracks from earlier in the film; an expanded edition with six bonus tracks was released for the first time when the album was reissued on Compact Disc on 25 February 2003 as part of the "James Bond Remastered" collection. Additionally, the music in the film was unfinished days before the film's release in theatres due to a late change by Eon Productions to use a title song with the same name as the film.

Title theme change
The original main title theme to Thunderball was titled "Mr. Kiss Kiss, Bang Bang", which was written by John Barry and Leslie Bricusse. The title was taken from an Italian journalist  who in 1962 dubbed agent 007 as "Mr. Kiss Kiss, Bang Bang". Barry had thought he could not write a song about a vague "Thunderball" term or the film's story, so his song was a description of the character James Bond.

The song was originally recorded by Shirley Bassey. When there were concerns with the length of the track compared to the needed titles, it was later rerecorded by Dionne Warwick as Bassey was not available and featured a longer instrumental opening designed so the lyrics would not be heard until after the title "Thunderball" appeared in Maurice Binder's title design. Neither version was  released until the 1990s. The song was removed from the title credits after United Artists requested that the theme song contain the film's title in its lyrics. When it was planned to use the Warwick version in the end titles Shirley Bassey sued the producers with the result being that neither version was heard in the film and different instrumental versions of the theme appeared on the High Fidelity (Bassey's) and Stereo (Warwick's) soundtrack LPs.

Barry teamed up with lyricist Don Black and wrote "Thunderball" in a rush. Tom Jones, who sang the new theme song, allegedly fainted in the recording booth after singing the song's final, high note. Jones said of the final note, "I closed my eyes and I held the note for so long when I opened my eyes the room was spinning."

Country musician Johnny Cash also submitted a song to Eon productions titled "Thunderball" but it was not used. The lyrics of Cash's "Thunderball" describe the film's story.

The producers' decision to change the film's theme song so close to the release date meant that only some of the film's soundtrack had been recorded for release on LP. Adding to the delay issues, Barry had written large amounts of the score around the original theme and woven it throughout the score (along with the recurring underwater "Search For Vulcan" motif). After "Thunderball" was written, Barry wrote, orchestrated, and recorded several new pieces interpolating it.

Though "Mr. Kiss Kiss Bang Bang" was dropped as the theme song, some of the pieces which included its melody remained part of the score, and it receives full statements twice: by full orchestra and jazz rhythm quartet with bass, drums, guitar, and vibraphone in the track "Café Martinique" (immediately followed by the "Vulcan" cue), and as a wild, bongo-laden cha-cha-cha in "Death of Fiona." The scene which includes the latter takes place at Club Kiss Kiss, and features the bongo drumming of bandleader King Errisson.

Composition
The tune was composed in the key of B-flat minor.

Track listing
 "Thunderball (Main Title)" – Tom Jones
 "Chateau Flight"
 "The Spa"
 "Switching the Body"
 "The Bomb"
 "Cafe Martinique"
 "Thunderball (Instrumental)"
 "Death of Fiona"
 "Bond Below Disco Volante"
 "Search for Vulcan"
 "007"
 "Mr. Kiss Kiss Bang Bang"
CD bonus tracks
 "Gunbarrel/ Traction Table/ Gassing the Plane/ Car Chase"
 "Bond Meets Domino/ Shark Tank/ Lights out for Paula/ For King and Country"
 "Street Chase"
 "Finding the Plane/ Underwater Ballet/ Bond with SPECTRE Frogmen/ Leiter to the Rescue/ Bond Joins Underwater Battle"
 "Underwater Mayhem/ Death of Largo/ End Titles"
 "Mr. Kiss Kiss Bang Bang (Mono Version)"

Notes

Outside the film
 In 1965, KYW-TV in Philadelphia adapted the "007" track, also used in the film From Russia with Love as its longtime theme for its Eyewitness News format. It went on to be used in other Group W stations in Boston, Pittsburgh, Baltimore and San Francisco for their newscasts.

Parodies / tributes
 In 1996, "Weird Al" Yankovic parodied Tom Jones during the opening theme song of the comedy Spy Hard. Instead of passing out, as Jones allegedly did, Yankovic's head explodes at the opening song's end.
 The opening theme to the Warner Bros. cartoon Duck Dodgers (2003–05), performed by Tom Jones with the Flaming Lips, is a pastiche of "Thunderball".
 Jones sang the theme during Sean Connery's AFI Life Achievement Award ceremony in 2006.
 Jaret Reddick, lead singer of Bowling For Soup, covered "Thunderball" on the 2017 multi-artist compilation album, Songs, Bond Songs: The Music Of 007.
 The melody from CD Bonus track 4 is used by My Life with the Thrill Kill Kult on their third studio album Sexplosion! track 5, "Mood No. 6".

See also
 Outline of James Bond

References

Bibliography
 Burlingame, Jon The Music of James Bond Oxford University Press, 01/10/2012
 Spencer, Kristopher. Film and Television Scores, 1950–1979: A Critical Survey by Genre. Jefferson, N.C.: McFarland & Co., 2008

Soundtrack albums from James Bond films
Soundtrack
1965 soundtrack albums
United Artists Records soundtracks
John Barry (composer) soundtracks